Major General Rashid Qureshi, SI(M), SBt, is a retired two-star general.

Military career
Qureshi was commissioned in the Pakistan Army on 17 April 1971 in the 44th PMA Long Course. During the Indo-Pakistani War of 1971, he was stationed at the Lahore Sector.
After the war, Qureshi's company was stationed at the Rawalpindi sector where he became a staff officer at the General Headquarters (GHQ). In 1987, he was promoted to Lieutenant Colonel, and was made General Officer Commanding of the 10th Battalion. In 1991, he became a Colonel in the Army, and was made Military Secretary to General Pervez Musharraf at the Joint Chief of Staff Committee Secretariat.
After the war, Qureshi's company was stationed at the Rawalpindi sector where he became a staff officer at the General Headquarters (GHQ). In 1987, he was promoted to Lieutenant Colonel, and was made General Officer Commanding of the tenth Battalion. In 1991, he became a Colonel in the Army, and was made Military Secretary to General Pervez Musharraf at the Joint Chief of Staff Committee Secretariat.

Inter-services public relations
In 1996, Qureshi joined the Inter-Services Public Relations (ISPR). In 1997, he was promoted as one-star general (brigadier-general) in the Army. In 1998, he was made director-general of the ISPR.

He was also a Principal Military Spokesperson of General Pervez Musharraf.

He retired from the Pakistan Army in 2005 and currently resides in Islamabad, Pakistan.

2007 helicopter crash
On 9 October 2007, in a helicopter crash which killed four people, and injured five, Qureshi was amongst those who were injured. The helicopter was one of three escorting Pervez Musharraf to Azad Kashmir.

References

|-

|-

Living people
Punjabi people
All Pakistan Muslim League politicians
Pakistani generals
Directors-General of the Inter-Services Public Relations
Year of birth missing (living people)